Sayyed Yaber (also Romanized as Seyyed Yāber; also known as ‘Ashīreh-ye Seyyed Jāber) is a village in Tarrah Rural District, Hamidiyeh District, Ahvaz County, Khuzestan Province, Iran. At the 2006 census, its population was 417, in 49 families.

References 

Populated places in Ahvaz County